Doug Anderson (born August 31, 1973 in Anderson, Indiana) is an American contemporary Christian singer. He is best known as Ernie Haase & Signature Sound's long time baritone (since 2002), but as of 2015 he resigned from his position to pursue a solo career. As of November 2021 Doug has re-signed with Signature Sound, replacing Devin McGlamery.

Early life
Anderson was born August 31, 1973, in Indiana, United States. As a youth at Lapel High School (the former building, that is), Doug played sports including basketball. He graduated in 1992. At Purdue University, he found a spot on the basketball team.

Career

He turned toward music during college, joining a quartet called Lighthouse. One day, Lighthouse met a group called the Cathedral Quartet, which featured Ernie Haase. A while later, Haase set out on his own and invited Anderson to join him. Ernie Haase & Signature Sound officially formed in 2003. Anderson released his debut album "Dreamin' Wide Awake", on May 3, 2011. Doug formed part of the American Christian music trio Cana's Voice in 2016. They released their debut album This Changes Everything the same year. It was followed by Live at Champion Forest and Don't Wanna Miss This, in 2017 and 2019 respectively.

Personal life
Anderson and his wife, who were high school sweethearts, married in August 1998. Michele and Doug have two daughters, Isabel and Emma. Doug's wife shares his love for sports.

Discography

 Dreamin' Wike Awake (2011)
 Feeling At Home: Back Porch Sessions (2013)
 Drive (2014) 
 The Only One (2016)
 Back Porch Christmas (2017)
 The Back Porch Sessions 2 (2020)

Awards
Anderson was nominated for Male Vocalist of the Year in 2011 by the Gospel Music Association. Doug has been honored by GMA Dove Award wins, including Country Album of the Year twice and Country Song of the Year as well as several nominations for Album of the Year (with Ernie Haase & Signature Sound).

GMA Dove Awards

References

External links

21st-century Christians
21st-century American male singers
21st-century American singers
American performers of Christian music
Performers of contemporary Christian music
1973 births
Living people
Country musicians from Indiana
American country singer-songwriters
American male singer-songwriters
Singer-songwriters from Indiana